Klára Issová (born 26 April 1979), sometimes known as Klára Issa, is a Czech film, stage and television actress. In 1997, she won the Czech Lion Award for Best Supporting Actress in Nejasná zpráva o konci světa.  She is the cousin of actress Martha Issová.

Early life
Born in Prague in 1979, she is the daughter of a Czech mother and Syrian director Michel Issa. In 1985, at the age of six, she started taking drama lessons. In 1993, she studied at the Prague Conservatory, graduating in 1997. She continued to act in the school theatre for another two years while studying pedagogy.

Career
Issova has appeared in many films, TV serials and plays. Her notable film appearances are in Indian Summer (1995), The Mists of Avalon (2001), Frank Herbert's Children of Dune (2003), and Surviving Life (2010). She also played a short role in the movie The Chronicles of Narnia: Prince Caspian (2008). In 2000, for the movie Angel Exit, she had her head shaved bald onscreen. She was nominated for Czech Lion Awards for best actress in 2000 for the same movie. Her noteworthy TV appearances are in No Problem (1997), Joan of Arc (1999), Anne Frank: The Whole Story (2001), and Operace Silver A (2007). Her stage credits include in Shots in Broadway and Private Eye.

Filmography
 Resistance (2020) .... Judith 
 Tichý společník (2020) .... Lenka
 Případ mrtvého nebožtíka (2020)
 Specialisté (2019) (TV)
 Happy Birthday, My Love (short) (2019) .... Veronika
 Pražské orgie (2019) .... Eva Kalinová
 Zoufalé ženy dělají zoufalé věci (2018) .... Olga
 Interlude in Prague (2017) .... Fraulein Ribber
 Všechno nebo nic (2017) .... Vanda
 Genius (2017) (TV) .... Marie Curie
 Angel of the Lord 2 (2016) .... Virgin Mary
 The Truth Commissioner (2016) .... Krystal
 Legends (2015) (TV) .... Ilyana (season 2)
 Killing Jesus (2015) .... Mary Magdalene
 The Last Knights (2014) .... Lt. Cortez’s Wife
 Zejtra napořád (2014) .... Jana
 Nosferatu in Love (Short) (2014) .... Luna
 Škoda lásky 2014 .... Hrdina
 Crossing Lines (2013) (TV) .... Shari
 Nicky's Family (2011)
 Surviving Life (2010)) .... Evzenie
 Jménem krále (2009) .... Ludmila of Vartemberk
 První krok (2009) TV series .... Adela Berger
 Soukromé pasti (2008) TV series .... Natalie (episode 01x08 Stolem sperm)
 The Chronicles of Narnia: Prince Caspian (2008) .... Hag
 The Wrong Mr. Johnson (2008) .... Veronika
 Medvídek (2007) .... Ema
 Operace Silver A (2007) (TV) .... Hana Kroupová
 Rules of Lies (film) (2006) .... Monika
 Grandhotel (2006) .... Ilja
 Angel of the Lord (2005) .... Virgin Maria
 Všichni musí zemřít (2005) .... Tereza
 In nomine patris (2004) .... Marie
 The Prince & Me (2004) .... English Teacher's Assistant
 O svatební krajce (2003) (TV) .... Princess Svatava
 Vrah jsi ty (2003) (TV) .... Dorotka
 Frank Herbert's Children of Dune (2003) .... Lichna
 Cesta byla suchá, místy mokrá (2003) (TV) .... Hanka
 Most (2003) .... Pavlínka
 Kočky  (2003) (TV) ....
 Rose and Maloney (2002) TV series .... Vanda Berkova {episode #2.1 (2005)}
 Múza je hrůza (2001) .... Muse/Jana
 Ratten - Sie werden dich kriegen (2001) (TV)
 Královská slib (2001) .... Princess
 The Mists of Avalon (2001) .... Raven
 Anne Frank: The Whole Story (2001) (TV) .... Janny Brandes-Brilslijper
 Bez tváře (2001) ....
 Frank Herbert's Dune (2000) .... Servant Girl
 Angel Exit (2000) .... Kája
 Touching Pictures (2000) ....
 Inferno (2000) .... Naďa
 Na zámku (2000) (TV) .... Olga
 In the Rye (1999) TV series
 Joan of Arc (1999) (TV) .... Michael's Wife
 Nejasná zpráva o konci světa (1997) .... Veronika
 Asi už to začalo (1997) .... Marie
 No Problem (1997) TV mini-series ....
 Sad (1996) .... Andulka
 Indian Summer (1995) .... Klára
 Když se slunci nedaří (1995) TV series .... Markéta Šnajberková (as Klára Issa)

Theatre

Divadlo Pod Palmovkou
The Handmaids .... Claire (Jeann Genet)
Shots on Broadway .... Ellen
Amadeus .... Constance (Peter Shaffer)
Ubohý vrah .... Anna (Pavel Kohout)
View from the Bridge .... Catherine
Private Eye .... Belinda
Kean .... Anna Dambi (Jean-Paul Sartre)
Closer .... ??? (Patrick Marber)
Dragon's Lair .... ??? (Viliam Klimacek)

Divadlo v Řeznické
Private Eye .... Belinda

Palace Theatre
Líbánky .... Sibylla Chase (Noël Coward)

References

External links
Official web 

Czech television actresses
Czech film actresses
Czech stage actresses
Actresses from Prague
Czech people of Syrian descent
1979 births
Living people
20th-century Czech actresses
21st-century Czech actresses
Czech Lion Awards winners